Abdülhak Hâmid Tarhan (born Abdülhak Hâmid; January 2, 1852 – April 12, 1937) was an early 20th-century Turkish playwright and poet.  He was one of the leading lights of the Turkish Romantic period. He is known in Turkish literature as "Şair-i Azam" (The Grand Poet) and "Dahi-i Azam" (The Grand Genius).

Early years

Abdülhak Hâmid Tarhan was born Abdülhak Hâmid on January 2, 1852, in Bebek, Constantinople. He is the grandson of Abdulhak Molla, a poet and physician at the court of Sultan Abdul Hamid II. His father was Hayrullah Efendi, a historian and ambassador. His mother, Münteha Hanım, was Circassian. Abdulhak Hâmid took private lessons from Yanyalı Tahsin Hoca and Edremitli Bahaddin Hoca while attending secondary school. In August 1863 he went to Paris, France with his brother Nasuhi, the workplace of his father. He continued his education there for one and a half years. After he returned to Istanbul, he enrolled in a French education school and worked in a translation office to advance his French. One year later, he followed his father, who was appointed to the Ottoman Embassy in Tehran, Iran. He studied the Persian language for more than one year as well as Arabic and Persian poetry. Following his father's death in 1867, he returned to Istanbul and entered civil service.

Professional life
After he came in contact with prominent literary personalities, Abdulhak Hâmid wrote his first prose Macera-yı Aşk (Love Affair) depicting his memoirs in Tehran. In 1871, he married Fatma.

Entered the service of foreign affairs, he was appointed in 1876 to the Ottoman Embassy in Paris, where he had the opportunity to learn the French literature.

In 1878, his first brush with controversy occurred on the publishing of his play Nesteren in Paris. It depicted a rebellion against a tyrannical ruler, and the actual ruler of Turkey at that time, Sultan Abdul Hamid II was so upset by it that he had the playwright fired from his government job.

He was appointed in 1881 to Poti, Georgia, in 1882 to Volos, Greece and in 1883 to Bombay, India. Due to illness of his wife, the family left India in 1885. On their way to Istanbul, his wife Fatma died in Beirut, then in the Ottoman Empire. She was buried there that inspired him to write his poem Makber (The Grave), which later became very popular.

 Because of his work "Zeynep", he was suspended of service at the Embassy in London and forced to return home. Only after his promise not to write anymore, he was allowed to return his post in London. He made his second marriage with a British woman Nelly. After two service years in The Hague in the Netherlands, he was appointed back to London. Abdulhak Hâmid returned to Turkey in 1900 due to illness of his wife. In 1906, he was sent to the Embassy in Brussels, Belgium.

In 1908, he became a member of the Turkish Senate. He lost his wife Nelly in 1911, and made later his third marriage with the Belgian Lucienne.

Abdulhak Hâmid had to return to Turkey after his deposing by the cabinet during the Balkan Wars. He spent a short time in Vienna, Austria after World War I and returned home with the proclamation of the Turkish Republic in 1923. He continued on in politics and was elected into the Grand National Assembly as deputy of Istanbul in 1928, a post he kept until his death.

Abdulhak Hâmid Tarhan died on April 12, 1937, and was laid to rest in the Zincirlikuyu Cemetery in Istanbul, with a national funeral.

Works
He was influenced by Tanzimat and also Namık Kemal, and in general, French writing. The loss of his wife was a key point in his life as he wrote and dedicated many pieces involving her, such as Makber. He leaves behind a legacy of western influences on the evolving Turkish literature scene and was considered one of the greatest Turkish romantics.

Poetry
Sahra (The Desert, 1879)
Makber (The Grave, 1885)
Ölü (The Corpse, 1885)
Hacle (1886)
Bunlar Odur (These are Her, 1885)
Divaneliklerim Yahut Belde (My Madness or the Town, 1885)
Bir Sefirenin Hasbihali (Chat With an Ambassadress, 1886)
Bala'dan Bir Ses (A Voice from Bala, 1912)
Validem (My Mother, 1913)
İlham-ı Vatan (Inspiration of the Motherland, 1916)
Tayflar Geçidi (The Parade of Spectrums, 1917)
Ruhlar (The Spirits, 1922)
Garam (My Passion, 1923).

Plays
Macera-yı Aşk (Love Affair, prose, 1873; in verse, 1910)
Sabr-u Sebat (Perseverance in Patience, 1875, staged at İstanbul City Theatres in 1961)
İçli Kız (The Oversensitive Girl, 1875)
Duhter-i Hindu (The Girl of India, 1876)
Nazife (Nazife, 1876, together with Abdüllahü's-Sağir, 1917)
Nesteren (Dog Rose, 1878)
Tarık Yahut Endülüs'ün Fethi (Tarık Or The Conquest Of Spain, 1879, simplified by Sadi Irmak and Behçet Kemal Çağlar, staged at İstanbul City Theatres, 1962)
Tezer Yahut Abdurrahman-ı Salis (Tezer or Abdurrahman III., 1880)
Eşber (Eşber, 1880)
Zeynep (Zeynep, 1908)
İlhan (İlhan, 1913)
Liberte (Freedom, 1913)
Finten (Finten, 1887)
İbn-i Musa Yahut Zadülcemal (İbn-i Musa or Zadülcemal, 1917)
Sardanapal (Sardanapal, 1917)
Abdüllahi's Sağir (Little Abdullah, 1917)
Yadigar-ı Harb (The Souvenir of The War, 1917)
Hakan (1935)
Cünun-ı Aşk (Insanity Of Love, serial, not published, 1917)
Kanuni'nin Vicdan Azabı (Remorse of Suleyman The Magnificent, 1937, not published).

İnci Enginün translated his plays into modern Turkish, published in seven volumes (1998–2002).

Other works
Mektuplar (Letters, collected by Süleyman Nazif, two volumes, 1916)
Hatırat (Memories, serials in the newspapers İkdam and Vakit, 1924–25)
Yusuf Mardin wrote about the years Abdulhak Hamit spent in London in a novel and published it under the name of Abdulhak Hamit'in Londrası (Abdulhak Hamit's London)

See also
 List of contemporary Turkish poets

References

External links
Bio at Osmanli700.gen.tr
Biography 

1851 births
1937 deaths
People from Beşiktaş
Turkish people of Circassian descent
20th-century Turkish poets
Turkish dramatists and playwrights
Diplomats of the Ottoman Empire
Burials at Zincirlikuyu Cemetery
20th-century writers from the Ottoman Empire
Deputies of Istanbul
Turkish expatriates in Iran
19th-century writers from the Ottoman Empire
19th-century poets from the Ottoman Empire